Peter Luykx (born 6 May 1964 in Neerpelt) is a Belgian politician and is affiliated to the N-VA. He was elected as a member of the Belgian Chamber of Representatives in 2010.

Notes

Living people
Members of the Chamber of Representatives (Belgium)
New Flemish Alliance politicians
1964 births
People from Neerpelt
21st-century Belgian politicians